Maryana Timofeevna Spivak (born 23 March 1985) is a Russian film and television actress known for the 2017 film Loveless.

For director Andrey Zvyagintsev's Loveless, the crew spent four months on casting the character Zhenya, though Spivak was an early candidate, eventually successful. Spivak said she took the opportunity for a starring role in a film and the chance to work with Zvyagintsev. 
For Loveless, Spivak was nominated for Best Actress at the Russian Guild of Film Critics awards.

Filmography

Film

Television

References

External links

 

1985 births
21st-century Russian actresses
Living people
Russian film actresses
Russian voice actresses
Russian television actresses
Russian stage actresses
Actresses from Moscow
Moscow Art Theatre School alumni